Another Face (released in the UK as It Happened in Hollywood) is a 1935 film directed by Christy Cabanne and starring Wallace Ford, Brian Donlevy and Phyllis Brooks. A wanted gangster has plastic surgery and becomes an actor.

Plot
Wanted by the police, murderer and gang leader Broken Nose Dawson (Brian Donlevy) goes to unscrupulous Dr. H. L. Buler (an uncredited Oscar Apfel) to have his appearance changed. Buler is assisted by nurse Mary McCall (Molly Lamont), who is aghast when she recognizes the patient. When Dawson heals, he is amazed by his new face; his underling, Muggsie Brown (Frank Mills, uncredited), remarks that he is now as handsome as a movie star.

Dawson sends Muggsie to eliminate Buler and McCall, then phones in an anonymous tip about his henchman to get rid of everyone who knows about his new appearance. Muggsie kills Buler and a nurse (only it is not McCall) and is in turn gunned down by the police. Frightened when she reads about the murders in the newspaper, McCall flees across the country.

Remembering Muggsie's comment, Dawson decides to become a movie star and moves to Hollywood, where he takes elocution lessons. Under the alias "Spencer Dutro", he gets hired to portray a gangster opposite top actress Sheila Barry (Phyllis Brooks) by director Bill Branch. Barry is unimpressed by Dutro's acting ability and inflated ego.

Meanwhile, Zenith Studio press agent Joe Haynes (Wallace Ford) is warned about his publicity stunts by Police Captain Spellman (an uncredited Charles Wilson). Studio general manager Charles L. Kellar (Alan Hale) agrees that Joe's zany antics have to stop.

Mary McCall calls on Haynes, sent by her fiance, Western star Tex Williams (Addison Randall), to get a job. She recognizes Dutro from publicity photos on Haynes' desk and tells Haynes who he is. When Dutro comes into the office, Haynes locks McCall in a closet for her safety. After getting Dutro to leave, however, Haynes decides not to call the police right away. He wants to milk the gangster's capture for all the publicity he can; Kellar reluctantly approves his plan.

Haynes arranges for everyone to work on the film that night, including an annoyed Barry (they were to fly to Yuma to get married). Things do not go quite as planned: when the police arrive, Dutro takes Barry hostage and flees. In the search of the studio grounds, Dutro also captures Haynes. When Dutro tries to leave a building and get to a car, Haynes pushes Barry outside and locks the door, with the two men inside. A chase ensues. In the end, Haynes manages to knock Dutro out, and is forgiven by Barry for his latest caper.

Cast

 Wallace Ford as Joe Haynes
 Brian Donlevy as Broken Nose Dawson, aka Spencer Dutro
 Phyllis Brooks as Sheila Barry
 Erik Rhodes as Grimm, assistant director
 Molly Lamont as Mary McCall
 Alan Hale as Charles L. Kellar
 Addison Randall as Tex Williams
 Paul Stanton as Bill Branch, director
 Oscar Apfel as Dr. H. J. Buler (uncredited)
 Hattie McDaniel as Nellie, Sheila's Maid (uncredited)

References

External links
 
 
 
 

American crime films
American black-and-white films
Films about filmmaking
Films directed by Christy Cabanne
Films set in Los Angeles
Films produced by Cliff Reid
1935 crime films
1935 films
1930s American films